Born and raised in Mauritius, where he attended the Royal College Curepipe, Yiagadeesen (Teddy) Samy is a Full Professor of International Affairs and the Director at the Norman Paterson School of International Affairs, Carleton University, Ottawa, Canada. He holds a B.A. in Economics and Mathematics from Glendon College, York University, an M.A. in economics from the University of Toronto, and a Ph.D. in economics from the University of Ottawa. His teaching and research interests are in the areas of International Trade, International Finance and Development Economics.

References

Academic staff of Carleton University
Living people
Year of birth missing (living people)
Mauritian academics